William S. Tavares (born April 16, 1963) is a retired American luger. He competed in doubles at the 1992 Winter Olympics, alongside Wendell Suckow, and finished ninth. He was a second lieutenant in the National Guard of the United States in 1992, and later became career military. In May 1999 he was appointed as the main coach of the US Olympic women's bobsled team.

References

1963 births
Living people
Lugers at the 1992 Winter Olympics
American male lugers
Olympic lugers of the United States